Between two worlds (original title: Zwischen zwei Welten) is a 1999 documentary film by director Bettina Haasen. The film focuses on the conversations between director Haasen and members of the nomadic Woodabe tribe in Nigeria. The documentary has an ethnographical approach.

Awards
 IDFA Award for best First Appearance (1999)
 FIPRESCI Prize (1999)

References

External links
 Between two worlds documentary online
 

German documentary films
1999 films
1999 documentary films
Anthropology documentary films
Documentary films about Nigeria
1990s German films